Jugiyapur is a small village located at the district of Jalaun in the state of Uttar Pradesh in India. Here's a famous place "Om Samdarshi Ashram & Samdarshi Sagar". It has a population of about 616 persons living in around 95 households. The primary languages spoken are English and Hindi.

Villages in Jalaun district